Destination: Dewsbury is a 2019 British comedy film directed by Jack Spring and written by David J. Keogh, Jonathan Marks, Aaron Nelson, Jack Spring, and John Spring.

Cast
 Matt Sheahan as Peter
 David J. Keogh as Adam
 Dan Shelton as Gaz
 Tom Gilling as Smithy

Production
The film was written in 2015 after director Jack Spring left The University of York. The budget for the film was raised over 12 months and production began in September 2016. The film was shot almost entirely in West Yorkshire. The BBC reported that this made Jack Spring the UK's youngest feature film director.

Release
The film held its world premiere at the 2018 Beverly Hills Film Festival. The film was released theatrically in the UK by Showcase Cinemas on 1 March 2019.

References

External links

David J. Keogh at IMDb

2018 films
British comedy films
Films set in Yorkshire
Dewsbury
2010s English-language films
2010s British films